Matthew George Millen (born March 12, 1958) is a former American football linebacker and executive. Millen played 12 years in the National Football League for the Oakland and Los Angeles Raiders, San Francisco 49ers, and Washington Redskins, playing on four Super Bowl-winning teams and winning a Super Bowl ring for each of the three franchises for which he played.

After his playing career, Millen was president and chief executive officer of the Detroit Lions from 2001 until the 2008 NFL season. His eight-year tenure as head of the franchise led to the worst eight-year record in the history of the modern NFL (31–84, a .270 winning percentage), and resulted in his termination on September 24, 2008. Millen assembled the personnel and coaching staff of the 2008 Lions, which became the first team to go 0–16. This was the worst single-season record in league history until it was tied by the 2017 Cleveland Browns. He is generally regarded among the worst general managers in the history of modern sports.

Following his NFL career, he was a football commentator for several national television and radio networks. His last job before joining the Lions was as a member of the number two broadcast team for NFL on Fox, as well as being the color commentator for Monday Night Football on Westwood One. On February 1, 2009, he joined the NBC broadcast team for pre-game analysis of Super Bowl XLIII. He has also been employed by ESPN as an NFL and college football analyst, and by the NFL Network as a color commentator on Thursday Night Football. In 2015, Millen returned to Fox NFL and debuted on the Big Ten Network.

Early life and education
Millen was born and grew up in the Hokendauqua section of Whitehall Township, Pennsylvania, a suburb of Allentown. He attended Whitehall High School in Pennsylvania's Lehigh Valley region. Whitehall High School competes in the Eastern Pennsylvania Conference, an elite high school athletic conference known for producing a great number of National Football League and other professional athletes, and Millen was a standout football player for the school.  

Whitehall High School later permanently retired Millen's Whitehall football jersey number (#83) in honor of his high school, collegiate, and NFL football accomplishments, making him one of only three Whitehall High School football players, along with fellow Whitehall High School alumni and NFL stars Saquon Barkley (#21) and Dan Koppen (#77), to have their Whitehall jersey numbers permanently retired in the school's history.

In April 2022, Millen also was inducted into the Lehigh Valley Sports Hall of Fame.

College career
Millen was recruited from Whitehall High School by Penn State, where he became an All-American defensive tackle for the Nittany Lions.

NFL career
Following his career at Penn State, Millen entered the 1980 NFL Draft and was selected by the Oakland Raiders with the draft's 43rd overall selection in the second round.

During his 12-year NFL playing career, Millen played for the Raiders, the San Francisco 49ers, and the Washington Redskins. He won a Super Bowl with each of these teams, including two with the Raiders (one when the team was based in Oakland and one during their stint in Los Angeles). He won one Super Bowl each with the 49ers and Redskins, though he was de-activated for Super Bowl XXVI while with the Redskins.

During his NFL career, he was selected to play in one Pro Bowl (in 1988).  Millen finished his 12 NFL seasons with 11 sacks and 9 interceptions, which he returned for 132 yards, and 8 fumble recoveries. He also returned 7 kickoffs for 72 yards. Tackles were not recorded at that time.

Television and radio career
Following his professional football career, Millen worked as a color commentator for CBS TV (which teamed him with Sean McDonough, Paul Olden, Mike Emrick, and Tim Ryan), and for Fox (which teamed him with Dick Stockton). He also provided game analysis for the radio broadcasts of Monday Night Football, working alongside Howard David on CBS's Westwood One radio network.

At Fox, Millen came to be considered the number-two analyst for its nationally broadcast games, behind John Madden (who had been teaming for years with Pat Summerall). He filled in for Madden, alongside Summerall, on the 1997 American Bowl game because John Madden had fears of flying.

Millen returned to broadcasting when he served as a studio analyst for NBC's coverage of Wild Card Saturday, his first television appearance in an analyst role since the 2000 NFC Divisional Playoffs, and reprised that role for NBC on their coverage of Super Bowl XLIII.

On June 15, 2009, Millen was named the lead analyst for the NFL Network's Thursday Night Football telecast, replacing Cris Collinsworth.  He was also a color analyst for ESPN College Football telecasts, teaming with Sean McDonough and Holly Rowe.

Detroit Lions management
In 2001, Millen left broadcasting to assume the job of the Detroit Lions' CEO and de facto general manager. At that time, Millen had no prior player development or front office experience.  When first approached by owner William Clay Ford, Sr. about the job, Millen told him "Mr. Ford, I really appreciate this, but I'm not qualified."  Ford responded "You're smart. You'll figure it out."

Millen was the Lions' CEO for seven full seasons, from 2001 to 2007; during that time, the club compiled a record of 31–81 (with at least nine losses each season). Detroit's .277 winning percentage was among the worst ever compiled by an NFL team over a seven-year period; only the Chicago Cardinals of 1939-45 (10-61-3, .141) and the Tampa Bay Buccaneers of 1983–1989 (26–86, .234) were less successful.

During the early part of Millen's tenure (2001–2003), the Lions failed to win a road game for three years (0–24) before opening the season with a win at the Chicago Bears in 2004. Overall, the Lions went 8–50 on the road during the Millen era.  Millen himself admitted to an interviewer in 2008 that the team's record under his leadership has been "beyond awful."  The Wall Street Journal said that NFL executives admit in private that Millen "has made more bad draft decisions than anyone else in two centuries."

Despite the team's record on the field, Millen was the second-highest paid general manager in the NFL.  With a draft record that included a number of high first-round draft picks who were considered poor choices (Charles Rogers, Joey Harrington, and Mike Williams among them), and widespread disappointment among fans, the media, and even some players, Millen received a five-year contract extension from Ford at the start of the 2005 season. Following the team's 3–13 performance in 2006, Ford announced that Millen would be retained as general manager for at least another season, because, according to inside sources to the Ford family, they still believed that Millen was the best general manager that the Lions ever had.
On September 24, 2008, Millen was confirmed to no longer hold his positions with the Lions. Whether he was dismissed or resigned was unclear. It was later reported by a team official that Millen was actually fired.

Competition committee
Millen was named to the NFL competition committee on August 4, 2006.

"Fire Millen" movement

The chant began to spread during a college basketball game between Michigan State and Wichita State at The Palace of Auburn Hills on December 10, 2005. It started when ousted Lions coach Steve Mariucci was shown on the big screen, prompting a standing ovation for Mariucci and a loud chant of "Fire Millen!" The chant was then heard during various home and away games of the other Detroit sports teams. It was also heard during Michigan and Michigan State basketball games. Former Pistons power forward Rasheed Wallace even took part in the chant during a late timeout in a December 16, 2005 game against the Chicago Bulls. A "Fire Millen" sign was shown in the background of a February 3, 2007 broadcast of ESPN College GameDay at the University of Kansas.  One large sign with the "Fire Millen" slogan was removed by NCAA officials at the NCAA Division II Football Championship in Florence, Alabama.

"Fire Millen" turned up in a background sign in the sports-oriented comic strip Gil Thorp on February 20, 2006 (Detroit News columnist Neal Rubin took over as the writer of Gil Thorp in 2004).

The "Fire Millen" chant returned in force to Ford Field during the second half of the 2006 Thanksgiving Day game between the Detroit Lions and the Miami Dolphins, when former Lions quarterback and first-round pick Joey Harrington (often a scapegoat for the Lions problems) led the Dolphins to a 27-10 victory over the Lions, dropping the Lions' record to 2-9. More "Fire Millen" chants were heard at wrestling events, namely WWE's WrestleMania 23 held at Ford Field, and TNA's Bound for Glory. For 2008, the "Fire Millen" chants were back in force during the game against the Green Bay Packers.

Other protests
On December 6, 2005, Detroit sports talk radio station WDFN announced the "Angry Fan March" (also known as the "Millen Man March") in protest of Millen's contract extension.

On December 9, 2005, in protest of Millen's poor record, one Detroit Lions fan site, known as "The Lions Fanatics," led by owner Dan Spanos organized an "orange out" event, which encouraged Lions fans to show up at Ford Field clad in hunter's orange, the color of their opponent that week, the Cincinnati Bengals.

In a game against Chicago on December 24, 2006, another group of fans, led by Herbert Nicholl Jr., planned a walkout protest towards the end of the first half to express their disgust with the current management.

Terminated from the Lions
After a 0-3 start to the Lions 2008 season, Lions vice chairman and Ford Motor Company Executive Chairman William Clay Ford, Jr., told reporters on September 22, 2008, if it were up to him, he would fire Millen. Despite this, the elder Ford claimed he had no plans to dismiss Millen.

However, on September 24, 2008, Millen's tenure as team president and general manager ended. Lions owner William Clay Ford later announced that Millen had been relieved of his duties as Lions General Manager and Team President. The Lions finished the 2008 season with a record of 0–16 and did not win again until Week 3 of the 2009 season.

On the January 3, 2009, edition of NBC's Football Night in America, Millen admitted his role in the team's downfall, saying he would have fired himself after the 2008 season. During NBC's pre-game show for Super Bowl XLIII, Detroit's affiliate WDIV-TV ran a ticker on their website, asking viewers to question his credibility as an NBC Sports panelist, given his past with the Lions. Over 36 pages of comments were posted on the station's website.

Personal life
Millen is married to Patricia Millen. They have four children and ten grandchildren.

Millen was diagnosed with the rare disease amyloidosis in 2017. In Millen's case, the disease affected his heart, reducing it to operating at about 30 percent capacity. Millen was told he needed a heart transplant to continue living. As he waited for one he began chemotherapy to rid himself of the amyloidosis.  The transplant surgery was performed at Beth Israel Medical Center in Newark, New Jersey on Christmas Eve 2018.

Controversies
On January 5, 1986, at Los Angeles Coliseum, after losing the AFC divisional playoff game to the New England Patriots, Millen intervened in an on-field dispute between Raiders player Howie Long and Patriots general manager, Patrick Sullivan, by punching Sullivan in the face. Sullivan said the punch made him "see stars" and that he required stitches. Millen later called the incident "a good hit."

In December 2003, following a Lions 45–17 loss to the Kansas City Chiefs at Arrowhead Stadium, Millen came under fire after a postgame incident with former Lions and then-Chiefs wide receiver Johnnie Morton.  Millen tried to congratulate some of the Chiefs players near the Chiefs' locker room, when he confronted Morton, who claimed that he wasn't going to say anything to Millen.  When he walked by him, Millen said, "Hey Johnnie."  Morton ignored him, and then Millen replied, "Nice talking to you," and Morton replied "Kiss my ass."  That's when Millen shouted, "You faggot! Yeah, you heard me. You faggot!" at Morton, which was heard by a member of the Chiefs public-relations staff and a Kansas City Star columnist.  Millen apologized for the incident, and after he was informed of Millen's remarks, Morton replied, "I apologize for what I said, but I never expected anything like that. What he said is demeaning and bigoted."  There had been bad blood between the two since Morton was released by the Lions after the 2001 season, and Morton felt like Millen "tossed him aside."

On April 24, 2010, at the 2010 NFL Draft, Millen apparently referred to fellow ESPN commentator Ron Jaworski as a "Polack," after which he made an on-air apology, stating that he "didn't mean anything" by the remark.

References

External links

 Matt Millen NFL statistics at databasefootball.com

1958 births
Living people
American Conference Pro Bowl players
American football linebackers
College football announcers
Detroit Lions executives
Heart transplant recipients
Los Angeles Raiders players
National Football League announcers
National Football League general managers
National Football League team presidents
NFL Europe broadcasters
Oakland Raiders players
Penn State Nittany Lions football players
Players of American football from Pennsylvania
San Francisco 49ers players
Sportspeople from Allentown, Pennsylvania
Washington Redskins players
Whitehall High School (Pennsylvania) alumni